Steeplechase may refer to:

 Steeplechase (horse racing), a type of horse race in which participants are required to jump over obstacles 
 Steeplechase (athletics), an event in athletics that derives its name from the steeplechase in horse racing
 Steeplechase (composition), a jazz standard by Bebop alto saxophonist Charlie Parker
 Steeplechase (dog agility), an event in dog agility
 Steeplechase (roller coaster)
Steeplechase (Blackpool Pleasure Beach) racing rollercoaster
 Steeplechase Park, a New York City amusement park from 1897 to 1964, named for its racing rollercoaster
Steeplechase Face, the mascot of Steeplechase Park
 Steeplechase Pier, a former Atlantic City, New Jersey, Boardwalk attraction destroyed in the 1944 Great Atlantic Hurricane
 The Steeplechase, a former Kennywood Park attraction which existed for two seasons, 1903-1904. 
 Steeplechase (video game), a 1975 arcade game released by Atari
 SteepleChase Records, a Danish jazz label
 Steeplechase Building, in Las Vegas, part of the Boardwalk Hotel and Casino

See also
 Steeple (disambiguation)
 Chase (disambiguation)